Russia participated at the Deaflympics after making its debut in 1993, until it was banned in 2022. Russia is just behind United States for winning the most medals in Deaflympics history. In the 2017 Summer Deaflympics held in Turkey, Russia was the medal topper with a record haul of 199 medals. After the 2022 Russian invasion of Ukraine, the International Committee of Sports for the Deaf (ICSD) banned athletes from Russia from that year's Deaflympics in Caxias do Sul, Brazil.
	
Russia has also been competing at the Winter Deaflympics from 1995.

Medal tallies

Summer Deaflympics

Winter Deaflympics

References 

 
Nations at the Deaflympics
Parasports in Russia